The Virgin with Angels, also known as The Song of the Angels is an oil painting by the French artist William-Adolphe Bouguereau. Its dimensions are 213.4 × 152.4 cm. It is exhibited at the Forest Lawn Museum.

William Bouguereau (1825–1905) painted the artwork in 1881. He studied at the Ecole des Beaux Arts in Paris, as well as in Rome, and was considered a leading French academic painter in the nineteenth century.  Legend has it that Bouguereau searched for a model for the painting’s figures and found them in his first wife, Nelly Monochablon, who posed for the angels, one by one, and at last, with a child in her arms. The painting shows a mother and child, calmly asleep in a pastoral setting, while a trio of angels hovers nearby. It highlights Bouguereau’s ability to render realistic flesh tones and subtle gradations of white. 

Song of the Angels was once a part of the Wanamaker Collection in Philadelphia. It was acquired by Forest Lawn Memorial Park in 1940 for a chapel in the Church of the Recessional. Originally, a stained-glass window was going to be the focal point of the chapel, but instead Forest Lawn decided to purchase the painting from Schnittjer’s gallery.  A large gothic-style liturgical frame was built for the painting by Forest Lawn craftsmen, and it is still presented in this wooden frame at the Forest Lawn Museum.

In 2005, the painting traveled to the Getty Center in Los Angeles for a cleaning with funding from the Conservation Partnership Program. Chief Paintings Conservator, Mark Leonard, worked on the painting for months to remove the old varnish and restore its original colors. Song of the Angels was exhibited at the Getty Center, alongside a preparatory oil sketch and a later, half-size replica from Bouguereau’s own hand.

References

 

1881 paintings
Paintings by William-Adolphe Bouguereau
Paintings in California
Paintings of the Madonna and Child
Angels in art
Musical instruments in art
19th-century allegorical paintings
Allegorical paintings by French artists
Cemetery art